Golden Grove Stud is a 259 acre property, established in 2014 by Sean Buckley and Vivian Oldfield in Denman in the Hunter Valley. It specialises in all aspects of equine care and selectively produces high achieving racehorses.

Golden Grove Stud is responsible for having produced the 2019-20 Australian Racehorse of The Year & winner of the 2022 King's Stand Stakes Nature Strip (Nicconi), as well as stakes performers Li’l Kontra (Krupt), Flying Award (Shamus Award) & The Barrister (Star Witness).

Other stakes winning graduates of note include Captain Duffy (Listed Geelong Classic, Geelong), Crown Witness (G3 Quezette Stakes, Caulfield) and Sovereign Award (G3 Caulfield, Flemington).

References

External links
 

Horse farms in Australia